is a Japanese actor and model who is affiliated with Stardust Promotion, then later JJ Promotion. He played the role of Hyde (Gosei Blue) in the 2010 Super Sentai TV series Tensou Sentai Goseiger.

Biography
Ono was born on August 9, 1989 in Tokyo, Japan. He has an older sister, Maaya, who also was an actress before his retirement from the entertainment industry in 2017. In 2004, Ono participated in the 17th Junon Super Boy Contest. He was a model for the magazine, Love Berry, and his acting debut was on the 2006 stage play, Tenimyu. Ono appeared on the same stage until 2008. In 2010, he appeared in Tensou Sentai Goseiger as Hyde/Gosei Blue. In his official blog on January 21, 2014, Ono announced that he left from Stardust Promotion and had a pause his activities. On February 13, 2015, he returned his entertainment activities with a new affiliation, JJ Promotion and appeared in the television drama, Messiah's Eisei no Fumi.

Filmography

TV series

Films

References

External links
 Profile at JJ Promotion 

Japanese male actors
Japanese male models
1989 births
Living people
People from Tokyo
Former Stardust Promotion artists